Materials is a monthly peer-reviewed open access scientific journal covering materials science and engineering. It was established in 2008 and is published by MDPI. The editor-in-chief is Maryam Tabrizian (McGill University). The journal publishes reviews, regular research papers, short communications, and book reviews. There are occasional special issues.

Abstracting and indexing 
The journal is abstracted and indexed in:

According to the Journal Citation Reports, the journal has a 2020 impact factor of 3.623.

References

External links 
 

Materials science journals
Publications established in 2008
Monthly journals
English-language journals
MDPI academic journals
Open access journals